2011 European Archery Grand Prix was the annual archery competition in Europe in 2011.

Meetings
 Antalya, Turkey
 Boé, France

Results

Antalya
The first leg of the Grand Prix was held between 11–16 April 2011 at the Centennial Archery Field in Antalya. 25 European nations and Iraq took part in the first meeting.

Men

Women

Mixed

Boe
The second leg of the Grand Prix was held between 23–27 May 2011 in Boe.

Men

Women

Mixed

References

2011 in archery
European Archery Grand Prix
Sport in Antalya
21st century in Antalya
European Archery Grand Prix
International archery competitions hosted by France
International archery competitions hosted by Turkey